Thomas Aloysius Crooke  (July 26, 1884 – April 4, 1929) was a first baseman in Major League Baseball. He played for the Washington Senators in 1909 and 1910.

External links

1884 births
1929 deaths
Major League Baseball first basemen
Washington Senators (1901–1960) players
Baseball players from Washington, D.C.
Springfield Ponies players
Hartford Senators players
Holyoke Paperweights players
Toronto Maple Leafs (International League) players
Trenton Tigers players
Reading Pretzels players
Bridgeport Orators players
Jersey City Skeeters players
Albany Senators players
New Bedford Whalers (baseball) players
Frederick Hustlers players
Martinsburg Mountaineers players
Minor league baseball managers